Sozoranga Canton is a canton of Ecuador, located in the Loja Province.  Its capital is the town of Sozoranga.  Its population at the 2001 census was 7,994.

References

External links
Official site

Cantons of Loja Province